Mecatlán is a municipality in Veracruz, Mexico. It is located in the north zone of the State of Veracruz, about 327 km from state capital Xalapa. It has an area of 48.53 km2.

Mecatlán is delimited to the north by Coyutla, to the north-east by Chumatlan, to the north-west by Coahuitlan to the south-east by Coxquihui and to the south-west by Filomeno Mata.

According the INEGI official stadistics, in 2020 year the total population in Mecatlán was about 12,799 persons (49.2% men y 50.8% women). Compared with the 2010 year, the total population has grown about an 8.39%. It produces principally maize and coffee.

In Mecatlán, in September there is a celebration in honor of archangel Michael, patron of the town.

The weather in Mecatlán is warm all year, with rains in summer and autumn.

References

External links 

  Municipal Official webpage
  Municipal Official Information
  Fuente oficial de poblacion

Municipalities of Veracruz